The Kramer Rocks are two rocks lying in the northern part of Beascochea Bay,  southeast of Cape Perez on the west coast of Graham Land, Antarctica. They were mapped by the Falkland Islands Dependencies Survey from photos taken by Hunting Aerosurveys Ltd in 1956–57, and were named by the UK Antarctic Place-Names Committee in 1959 for J.G.H. Kramer, an Austrian army physician who independently recognized scurvy as a nutritional deficiency disease and showed how it could be prevented or cured, in about 1737.

References

Rock formations of Graham Land
Graham Coast